"The Philosophical Manifesto of the Historical School of Law" (German: "Philosophische Manifest der historischen Rechtsschule") is a manuscript written by German political philosopher Karl Marx in 1842. It was first published in the Supplement to the Rheinische Zeitung No. 221, August 9, 1842. The chapter about marriage was cut by the censor in the original publication. The complete article was first published in MECW 1927.

References

External links
The Philosophical Manifesto of the Historical School of Law, German text

1842 documents
Books by Karl Marx
Books in political philosophy
Communist books
Manifestos